Natasha Delia Letitia Gordon  (born 1976) is a British playwright of Jamaican heritage. In 2018, having previously been an actor, with her debut play Nine Night she became the first black British female playwright to have a play staged in the West End.

Life 
Natasha Gordon was born in North London in 1976, to parents who were both migrants from Jamaica.  Her grandparents had arrived in London from Jamaica by boat as part of the so-called Windrush generation in the late 1950s. Her mother joined them in 1963, finding work, a Jamaican-born husband and a reassuringly familiar West Indian community there.

Gordon's debut play Nine Night premiered at London's National Theatre in April 2018 to critical acclaim, transferring seven months later to London's Trafalgar Studios on 1 December. The transfer marks a pivotal moment in history as Gordon will become the first black British female playwright to have a play in the West End. In a Guardian newspaper profile on her, Gordon explains that the "nine night" ritual of gathering to eat, drink and swap stories helped her to connect with her family’s past and inspired her first play. She also cites the recent deportation threats experienced by many of the Windrush generation as fuel for her to learn more about the difficulties her grandparents faced. The play resulted in Gordon winning the London Evening Standard Theatre Awards  Charles Wintour Award for Most Promising Playwright in 2018.

As an actor, Gordon's stage credits include Red Velvet (Tricycle Theatre), The Low Road and Clubland (Royal Court Theatre), Mules (Young Vic) and As You Like It (Royal Shakespeare Company).  Her film and TV credits include Dough, Line of Duty, Class and Danny and the Human Zoo.

In 2019, The Guardian writers ranked Nine Night the 17th best theatre show since 2000. Gordon was appointed Member of the Order of the British Empire (MBE) in the 2020 New Year Honours for services to drama.

Career

Acting

Theatre 

 Red Velvet by Lolita Chakrabarti (2012), The Tricycle
 Speechless by Linda Brogan & Polly Teale (2010) Sherman Cymru
 The Exception and the Rule by Bertolt Brecht (2004), Young Vic
 As You Like It by William Shakespeare (2003), Royal Shakespeare Company
 Inside Out by Tanika Gupta, (2002) Arcola Theatre
 Skin Deep, (2002) Warehouse Theatre, Croydon
 Aladdin (2002) Lyric Theatre (Hammersmith)
 Top Girls (2001), Battersea Arts Centre
 Clubland by Roy Williams (2001), Royal Court Theatre

Film and television 

 Class (2016)
 Line of Duty (2016)
 Danny and the Human Zoo (2015)
 Dough (2015)
 Secrets and Worlds (2012)
 Law & Order UK (2010)
 10 Days to War (2008)
 Doctors (2006, 2007 and 2016)
 EastEnders (2007)
 Little Miss Jocelyn (2006)
 Holby City (2004)
 The Bill (2000)

Writing 

 Nine Night (2018) National Theatre

Awards and nominations

References 

1976 births
Living people
21st-century English actresses
21st-century English dramatists and playwrights
21st-century English women writers
Actresses from London
Black British actresses
Black British writers
English people of Jamaican descent
English women dramatists and playwrights
Members of the Order of the British Empire
Critics' Circle Theatre Award winners